Kronik may refer to:

 KroniK, an American professional wrestling tag team
 Kronik (album), 1998 album by Voivod

See also
Kronic (disambiguation)
Kronick, surname